Fjarðarheiðargöng, also known as Seyðisfjarðargöng, is a planned road tunnel along route 93 in eastern Iceland. The tunnel would replace a 600m high pass between Seyðisfjörður and Egilsstaðir. Construction is scheduled to begin in 2022. The reason for construction is that the pass is often hit by snow storms making it impassable, and that the only car ferry reaching Iceland calls at Seyðisfjörður.

References

External links
 http://fjardarheidargong.is/

Road tunnels in Iceland
Proposed road tunnels in Europe